Colin Ebelthite (born 27 November 1984) is a former Australian professional tennis player.

Ebelthite's highest ATP singles ranking is World 209, which he reached on 23 June 2008. His career high in doubles was at 98 set at 17 September 2012. The South Australian won three Futures titles including Sorrento (WA), Perth and Wellington. Ebelthite joined the Australian Institute of Sport (AIS) Pro Tour squad in January. His impressive run saw his ranking rocket to a career high 230, an outstanding feat given only sixteen months before he was ranked No.703 in the world. While qualifying for his grand slam he defeated Australian rising talent Bernard Tomic. Ebelthite competed in the Australian Open in 2009 where he was knocked out in the first round by Andreas Beck.

Grand Slam doubles timeline

External links
 
 
 

1984 births
Living people
Australian male tennis players
Tennis people from South Australia
20th-century Australian people
21st-century Australian people